Puzzle Guzzle is a video game for the PlayStation Portable. This game is based on puzzles and you get assigned an avatar which can be customized during the game

Gameplay
It's a block puzzle game where you spin sections of a puzzle as blocks fall in order to make triangular shapes match up for lines and shapes that roll into combos.

References

External links

2007 video games
Irem games
Multiplayer and single-player video games
PlayStation Portable games
PlayStation Portable-only games
Puzzle video games
Video games developed in Japan
Agetec games